Ibn an-Nawwahah was a messenger for Musaylimah, a purported prophet during the time of Muhammad who had gained a significant following through his tricks and miracles, teachings and from the fact that he was from Yamamah. Many people of the Rabiah Tribe of Yamamah were greatly hostile to Muhammad and the tribe of Quraish, so in an exchange between a man of the Rabiah tribe and Musaylimah, one man said:

"...a liar of the Rabi'ah tribe of Yamamah is better than a truthful person of the Mazar tribe of the Hijaz"1

Ibn an-Nawwahah went to Muhammad with a message from Musaylimah consisting of Musaylimah's idea that the world should be split between himself and Muhammad, as they were both prophets of Allah. Muhammad retorted that the division of the world is for Allah to decide. In an exchange between an-Nawwahah and some other messengers of Musaylimah recorded in Sunan Abu Dawood 14:2755:

I heard the Apostle of Allah (peace_be_upon_him) say when he read the letter of Musaylimah: What do you believe yourselves? They said: We believe as he believes. He said: I swear by Allah that were it not that messengers are not killed, I would cut off your heads.

Muhammad couldn't kill them because they were diplomatic emissaries, but this statement made by him would stick in the minds of some Muslims. Ultimately Ibn an-Nawwahah's life still ended by the sword of a Muslim, namely Qarazah ibn Ka'b as recorded in Sunan Abu Dawood 14:2756:

Harithah ibn Mudarrib said that he came to Abdullah ibn Mas'ud and said (to him): There is no enmity between me and any of the Arabs. I passed a mosque of Banu Hanifah. They (the people) believed in Musaylimah. Abdullah (ibn Mas'ud) sent for them. They were brought, and he asked them to repent, except Ibn an-Nawwahah. He said to him: I heard the Apostle of Allah (peace_be_upon_him) say: Were it not that you were not a messenger, I would behead you. But today you are not a messenger. He then ordered Qarazah ibn Ka'b (to kill him). He beheaded him in the market. Anyone who wants to see Ibn an-Nawwahah slain in the market (he may see him).

It isn't completely settled whether Ibn an-Nawwahah was the only messenger or if other followers of Musaylimah had accompanied him, but it is more likely that an-Nawwahah was the only such messenger.

See also
Non-Muslim interactants with Muslims during Muhammad's era

External links
A chapter from "The Message"

7th-century Arabs